Live entertainment may refer to:

 LIVE Entertainment, a former name of Artisan Entertainment
 Live entertainment performed in the presence of the viewer
 Various kinds of live performance

See also
Live Nation Entertainment, American global entertainment company
Lagardère Live Entertainment, entertainment agency subsidiary of Lagardère Group
Disney Live Entertainment, theatrical live entertainment production division of Walt Disney Imagineering
Live Entertainment Corporation of Canada, better known as Livent
Live: Entertainment or Death, 1999 live album by American heavy metal band Mötley Crüe
Entertainment Live, Philippine showbiz oriented talk show